British Showjumping is the Great Britain governing body for the equestrian sport of showjumping. It provides the competitors for Team GBR in international competition and sets the rules under which affiliated competitions are held. It is one of the 16 organisations which form part of the British Equestrian Federation.

In 2013, the former Olympic bronze medallist David Broome was appointed BSJA president.

References

External links
 British Showjumping Association official website

Equestrian organizations
Animal charities based in the United Kingdom
Organisations based in Warwickshire
Equestrian sports in the United Kingdom
Show jumping
Show jumping